BFF may stand for:

 "Backend for Frontend" pattern, a client-oriented design of web and mobile API in frontend and backend development
 Backup-file Format, a data archive format used by IBM AIX
 Bangladesh Football Federation, the governing body of football in Bangladesh
 Basque Football Federation, the governing body of football in the Basque Country
 Ben Folds Five, an American rock band
 Best friends forever, a close friendship
 "BFF", a song by Kesha from the album High Road (2020)
 "BFF", a song by Slayyyter featuring Ayesha Erotica from the mixtape Slayyyter (2018)
 BFF: Best Friends Forever, a 2009 Filipino comedy film
 Bicycle Film Festival, a festival to celebrate the bicycle through music, art, and film 
 Boston Film Festival, an annual film festival in Boston, Massachusetts, United States
 Blaenau Ffestiniog railway station (National Rail station code), near Gwynedd, Wales
 Western Nebraska Regional Airport (IATA code), near Scottsbluff, Nebraska, United States

See also 
 Best friends forever (disambiguation)
 BF2 (disambiguation)
 BFFs, a 2014 American comedy film
 "BFFs" (The Cleveland Show), a 2011 episode of The Cleveland Show
 "BFFS" (The Boys Presents: Diabolical), a 2022 episode of The Boys Presents: Diabolical